Freshwater Bay (previously, Novaia and New harbor) is an inlet in the U.S. state of Alaska. It is situated on the eastern shore of Chichagof Island, Chatham Strait, in the Alexander Archipelago. On the northeast side of the bay, a thick series of melaphyre lava flows and tuffs are interstratified with limestone of Upper Devonian age.

References

Alexander Archipelago
Bays of Alaska
Bays of Hoonah–Angoon Census Area, Alaska
Bodies of water of Sitka, Alaska